Christian Piper (born 7 December 1941 in Oleśnica, Lower Silesia, Germany; died 2019 in Eisenach, Thuringia, Germany) was a German artist.

Life 

Piper studied art in Aachen together with Bauhaus students of Paul Klee and Johannes Itten as well as at the Folkwang Hochschule Essen Werden (BA Art 1970). In the 1970s he specialized in painting, went to New York, and became an assistant to Milton Glaser at Push Pin Studio, at that time one of the leading forces in graphic design and illustration. Piper soon worked for the New York Times, the New Yorker, and Vogue. He also designed and illustrated book and record covers, including several albums for The Rolling Stones, who received their first ever Grammy Award for the cover of Tattoo You in the category of Best Album Package with illustrations by Piper. Later he increasingly dedicated himself to fine art, producing sculptures and various series of drawings and paintings. In 2005 he returned to Germany, where he lived and worked in Berlin and Görlitz.

Recognition 

 1971 Folkwang sponsorship award
 1980 Gold Award Art Directors Club Chicago
 1988 Century City Gallery, Los Angeles

Exhibitions 

 Century City Gallery, Los Angeles
 Hall of Fame, Minnesota
 Illustrator Guild, NYC
 Meru Art Gallery, Brooklyn
 Canal Pier, NYC: public installation stone collection West Side remnants
 1999–2004: 20 ft. Sphinx installation with geomantic impact: head in juncture with Empire State Building to Statue of Liberty / New Jersey Tunnel in juncture to WT Center
 Manhattan Bridge Viaduct – Installation Habitat II
 Brooklyn Bridge – Installation Habitat IV
 2016: Christian Piper – Just for Now, PRIVATEOFFSPACE

Museums 

 MoMA NYC
 Hall of Fame – Minnesota
 Rolling Stone Museum – San Francisco

Literature 

 Tina Sabel-Grau und Christian Piper: Bunter Regen – Nichts existiert so wie es erscheint. Mutterliebe.net, Stuttgart, 2020.

External links 

 Christian Piper: In Memoriam Christian Piper 1941–2019

References 

1941 births
2019 deaths
20th-century German artists
21st-century German artists
People from the Province of Lower Silesia